The Red Grasshawk, also known as Common Parasol, and Grasshawk dragonfly, (Neurothemis fluctuans) is a species of dragonfly in the family Libellulidae. It is widespread in many Asian countries.

References

Sources
 fluctuans.html World Dragonflies
 IUCN Red List

Libellulidae
Insects described in 1793